Ivan Katalinić (born 17 May 1951) is a former Croatian footballer and former manager who had a successful playing career with Hajduk Split and Southampton in the 1970s and 1980s. As a member of Hajduk's famous "golden generation" of the 1970s, he won four Yugoslav championships and five consecutive cups.

In early 1980, he moved to Southampton where he stayed for three and a half seasons. On his return from England, Katalinić  once again joined Hajduk becoming part of the coaching staff and a third choice goalkeeper for the 1983–84 season.

So far in his managerial career Katalinić has managed 17 clubs. Most success was achieved with Hajduk from 1993 until 1995. Two Croatian championships and cups were won along with two supercups. Season 1994–95 is remembered as the most successful in Hajduk's history. Besides winning the double, Hajduk reached quarterfinals of the Champions League. From 1996 until 2002 he was part of the Croatian national team's coaching staff that led Croatia to bronze medal in the World Cup 1998.

Playing career

Club

Despite signing his first professional contract with Hajduk in the summer of 1970, Katalinić had to wait more than a year for his debut. The long-awaited day occurred on 29 September 1971, when he came on as a substitute for injured Radomir Vukčević in the European Cup first-round return-leg in Split, against Valencia. However, in the face of stiff competition Katalinić would not become first-choice goalkeeper until 1975. He then kept the number one jersey for the following two seasons, before losing it due to military service, which was obligatory at the time. Upon his return from the army in May 1979, Katalinić played only one game, adding just three more at the beginning of the following season: transfer abroad was on the horizon. After trials with W.B.A. and Derby County, followed by unsuccessful attempts to gain his work permit, Katalinić finally made a breakthrough with Southampton.

After signing a four-year contract with Southampton in February 1980, Katalinić became the first Croatian ever to play in the First Division (today known as the Premier League). To date, he remains  the only Croatian goalkeeper to have played in the English top-flight. During the next two-and-a-half years he made 54 appearances for Southampton in all competitions. For the 1982–83 season Southampton signed England goalkeeper Peter Shilton, whose arrival moved Katalinić to the bench. After cancelling his contract with Southampton in the summer of 1983, he signed with Hajduk as a third-choice goalkeeper and an assistant coach.

International
As a goalkeeper Katalinić was capped 13 times for Yugoslav national team. His debut came on 30 January 1977 when Yugoslavia beat Colombia 1–0 at Estadio El Campín in Bogotá and his last game was in Rome on 18 May 1978 versus Italy at stadio Olimpico in a scoreless draw.

Style of play
Due to his calmness and composure on the field, Katalinić was nicknamed "Banks". He was described as having excellent reflexes, and was particularly skilled in one-on-one duels with the opposing players. Katalinić also had the ability to read the game and predict the offensive action well in advance, which he used to alert and direct the defence.

Managerial career
After ten years on Hajduk's coaching staff as an assistant and goalkeeper coach, in March 1993 Katalinić was appointed as a manager. Under his helm, two months later, Hajduk won Croatian Cup after two legged final against great rival Dinamo Zagreb. The following season Hajduk were champions of Croatia and in 1994–95 first Croatian double crown was rounded with Champions League quarterfinal clash with eventual winners Ajax. Following season Hajduk failed to qualify for the Champions League after losing to Panathinaikos. Two months later Katalinić resigned after being knocked out of the Croatian Cup. In 1996–97 came his first managerial job abroad when he signed a one-year contract with Hapoel Haifa. Return to Croatia followed where he took over minnows Zadar leading them to championship play-offs. Second spell with Hajduk followed but no trophies were won.

In the new century Katalinić had two more attempts but did not manage to qualify for the Champions League. With Zagreb, in 2002, he failed to overcome ZTE while two years later short episode with Hajduk ended soon after crushing out against Shelbourne. He coached Rijeka on two occasions, saving them from relegation in his first spell with the club. However, in Ukraine Katalinić's effort was not enough to save Metalurh Zaporizhzhia from the drop. After five years of coaching abroad (Bahrain, Albania, Hungary, Bosnia and Herzegovina) in the summer of 2009 Katalinić surprised many with his move to ambitious Croatian Third Division side Dugopolje.

Katalinić led Dugopolje to its historic first promotion to the Croatian Second Division. In June 2010 return to First Division football followed as he signed a contract with RNK Split. He led them to the third position in 2010–11 Prva HNL, and for the first time in the club's history reaching a spot in European competitions. After progressing past Domžale in the second qualifying round of 2011–12 UEFA Europa League, they were eliminated by Fulham. In August 2011, he was sacked as manager as the board was unsatisfied with the results made in the beginning of the season. In September 2012, Katalinić took over the helm of GOŠK Gabela for the second time.
In May 2013 he became the manager of Slaven Belupo. 

In July 2016 he was named the head coach of Šibenik, but after the team lost to NK Zagreb, and continued a poor series, he was sacked on 9 October 2016.

Managerial statistics

Honours and awards

As player 
Hajduk Split
Yugoslav First League: 1970–71, 1973–74, 1974–75, 1978–79
Yugoslav Cup: 1972, 1973, 1974, 1976, 1977

As manager 
Hajduk Split
Croatian First League (2): 1993–94, 1994–95
Croatian Cup (2): 1992–93, 1994–95
Croatian Super Cup (3): 1993, 1994, 2004

Dugopolje
Croatian Third League (South) (1): 2009–10

Individual 
Tempo magazine Award for Best Yugoslav goalkeeper: 1975–76
Trophy Bili for the best Hajduk player: 1976–77
Daily Star Golden Glove Award for the best First Division goalkeeper of the month: December 1981
Supersport (weekly magazine published by Sportske Novosti) Croatian Coach of the Year: 1994, 1995
City of Split Sport Federation Award for the city of Split Coach of the Year: 1994, 1995
State award for sport - Red hrvatskog pletera 1998.

References

External links
 
Ivan Katalinić at Sportnet.hr
Saints Players You Have Never Heard Of!: Ivan Katalinić

1951 births
Living people
People from Trogir
Association football goalkeepers
Yugoslav footballers
Yugoslavia international footballers
HNK Trogir players
HNK Hajduk Split players
Southampton F.C. players
Yugoslav First League players
English Football League players
Yugoslav expatriate footballers
Expatriate footballers in England
Yugoslav expatriate sportspeople in England
Croatian football managers
HNK Hajduk Split managers
NK Osijek managers
Hapoel Haifa F.C. managers
NK Zadar managers
Ittihad FC managers
NK Varaždin managers
HNK Rijeka managers
NK Zagreb managers
FC Metalurh Zaporizhzhia managers
Riffa SC managers
FK Dinamo Tirana managers
Dunaújváros FC managers
NK GOŠK Gabela managers
HŠK Posušje managers
NK Široki Brijeg managers
NK Dugopolje managers
RNK Split managers
NK Slaven Belupo managers
NK Jedinstvo Bihać managers
HNK Šibenik managers
Croatian Football League managers
Ukrainian Premier League managers
Kategoria Superiore managers
Premier League of Bosnia and Herzegovina managers
Croatian expatriate football managers
Expatriate football managers in Israel
Croatian expatriate sportspeople in Israel
Expatriate football managers in Saudi Arabia
Croatian expatriate sportspeople in Saudi Arabia
Expatriate football managers in Ukraine
Croatian expatriate sportspeople in Ukraine
Expatriate football managers in Bahrain
Croatian expatriate sportspeople in Bahrain
Expatriate football managers in Albania
Croatian expatriate sportspeople in Albania
Expatriate football managers in Hungary
Croatian expatriate sportspeople in Hungary
Expatriate football managers in Bosnia and Herzegovina
Croatian expatriate sportspeople in Bosnia and Herzegovina